Mazzocco is an Italian surname. Notable people with the surname include:

Davide Mazzocco (born 1995), Italian footballer
Martín Stefanonni Mazzocco (born 1964), Mexican lawyer and politician
Stefano Mazzocco (born 1980), Italian footballer

See also
Mazzucco

Italian-language surnames